This is a list of lighthouses in Spain.

Lighthouses

By autonomous communities 
 List of lighthouses in the Balearic Islands
 List of lighthouses in the Canary Islands

See also 
 Lists of lighthouses and lightvessels
 List of tallest lighthouses

References

External links